Bou Arada is a town and commune in the Siliana Governorate, Tunisia. As of 2004 it had a population of 12,273.

Climate
In Bou Arada, there is a local steppe climate. In winter there is more rainfall than in summer. The Köppen-Geiger climate classification is BSk. About  of precipitation falls annually.

See also
List of cities in Tunisia

References

Populated places in Tunisia
Communes of Tunisia
Tunisia geography articles needing translation from French Wikipedia